A fishtank is a container housing fish.

Fishtank or Fish Tank may also refer to:
Fish Tank (video game)
Fish Tank (film), directed by Andrea Arnold
Fishtank Ensemble, a musical group
Fishtank Interactive, a game company